Dietrich in London is a Marlene Dietrich's live album. The album was issued on Columbia Records OS 2830.
"Marlene Dietrich in London" opened on November 23, 1964 at the Queen's Theatre. This recording was produced on the closing night, December 12, 1964. The album was released in Australia, by Philips Records in 1965, coincide with her visit in the country.

Track listing

See also
 Marlene Dietrich discography

References

1965 live albums
Marlene Dietrich albums
Live traditional pop albums